Blythe Hartley (born May 2, 1982) is a Canadian Olympic diver. She was born in Edmonton, Alberta and began diving at age 12.

Personal life
She went to the National Sport School in Calgary, Alberta with many other top Canadian athletes.  Hartley attended Handsworth Secondary School before going on to attend the University of Southern California where she graduated in 2006 with a degree in communications. She was CTV diver analyst during 2012 Summer Olympics.

Diving career
Hartley won her first gold medal at the world aquatic championships in the 1 m springboard in Fukuoka, Japan in 2001, and won a bronze at the 2003 World Aquatics Championships in 3 m springboard in Barcelona, Spain. Her best finish at the 2000 Summer Olympics was in 3 m springboard synchro where she finished 5th. She won her first Olympic medal at the 2004 Summer Olympics where she won a bronze with partner Émilie Heymans in the synchronized 10 m platform event.

Hartley also won a gold medal at the 2005 World Aquatics Championships in Montreal in the springboard event.

The North Vancouver resident concluded her competitive career at the 2008 Beijing Olympics, where she placed fourth in the three-metre springboard.

References

External links 
 Profile at Diving Canada 
 Athlete bio at CBC.ca
 

1982 births
Living people
Canadian female divers
Commonwealth Games gold medallists for Canada
Commonwealth Games silver medallists for Canada
Divers at the 1998 Commonwealth Games
Divers at the 2006 Commonwealth Games
Divers at the 2000 Summer Olympics
Divers at the 2004 Summer Olympics
Divers at the 2008 Summer Olympics
Medalists at the 2004 Summer Olympics
Olympic bronze medalists for Canada
Olympic divers of Canada
Olympic medalists in diving
Divers from Edmonton
World Aquatics Championships medalists in diving
Pan American Games gold medalists for Canada
Pan American Games silver medalists for Canada
Pan American Games bronze medalists for Canada
Commonwealth Games medallists in diving
Pan American Games medalists in diving
Divers at the 2003 Pan American Games
Divers at the 1999 Pan American Games
Medalists at the 1999 Pan American Games
Medallists at the 1998 Commonwealth Games
Medallists at the 2002 Commonwealth Games
Medallists at the 2006 Commonwealth Games